Bromley Halt was a small railway stop on the Wombourne Branch Line. It had very poor patronage and, along with the rest of the line's passenger stations, was closed just seven years after its introduction by the Great Western Railway in 1925. The halt served the communities between Pensnett, Wordsley and Kingswinford.

Bromley Halt ran alongside the Stourbridge Extension Canal, which itself was eventually removed. Only two platforms and a single line from Bromley Halt to Pensnett Halt and Kingswinford Junction remain.

References

Further reading

Disused railway stations in Dudley
Former Great Western Railway stations
Railway stations in Great Britain opened in 1925
Railway stations in Great Britain closed in 1932